Dasyceps is an extinct genus of zatracheidid temnospondyl from the early Permian of England.

History of study 
Dasyceps was originally named in 1850 for the type species, D. bucklandi, which honors English paleontologist William Buckland, but under the now defunct genus "Labyrinthodon," which is now regarded as a junior synonym of the Triassic capitosaur Mastodonsaurus. The new genus name for the species was created by Thomas Huxley in 1859. A detailed description of the taxon was given in German by the German paleontologist Friedrich von Huene in 1910. The most recent description is that of Paton (1975).  A second species from Texas, D. microphthalmus, was originally named as a species of Zatrachys but was moved to Dasyceps by Paton (1975).

Anatomy 
Dasyceps is the largest of the three zatracheidid genera, with a skull length approaching 30 cm. It is diagnosed by the following features: (1) proportionately long, U-shaped skull and elongate premaxillae; (2) relatively posteriorly situated nares; (3) dorsal exposure of septomaxilla replaced by nasal and maxilla, which contact posterior to the naris, excluding the lacrimal; (4) quadratojugal expanded but without spikes; (5) tabular posteriorly expanded; (6) long suture between squamosal and tabular. Compared to other zatracheidids, the internarial fontanelle of D. bucklandi forms a nearly perfect teardrop-shaped opening that divides the nasals more than in Acanthostomatops but that does not divide the frontals as is found in Zatrachys.

Dasyceps bucklandi is only known from a holotype skull split into a part and counterpart block. Dasyceps microphthalmus is known from the holotype and two referred specimens.

References

Permian temnospondyls of Europe
Taxa named by Thomas Henry Huxley
Fossil taxa described in 1859
Prehistoric amphibian genera
Zatracheidae